"Maréchal, nous voilà !" ("Marshal, here we are!") is a 1941 French song dedicated to Marshal Philippe Pétain. The lyrics were composed by André Montagard; its music was attributed to André Montagard and Charles Courtioux but actually plagiarized from a song composed for the 1933 musical " by Polish Jewish composer Kazimierz Oberfeld, who was deported to Auschwitz in 1945, where he died. 

Lyrics

Notes

Bibliography
 Nathalie Dompnier, « Entre La Marseillaise et Maréchal, nous voilà ! quel hymne pour le régime de Vichy ? », pp. 69–88 , in Myriam Chimènes (dir.), La vie musicale sous Vichy, Éditions Complexe – IRPMF-CNRS, coll. « Histoire du temps présent », 2001, 420 p.  
Maréchal, nous voilà ! mp3 recording (French)

1940 songs
French songs
French anthems
Propaganda songs
Songs about politicians
Songs about military officers
Vichy France
Cultural depictions of Philippe Pétain
Songs with music by Casimir Oberfeld